Cunniffe is a surname. Notable people with the surname include:

Bernard Cunniffe, English professional rugby league footballer
Emma Cunniffe (born 1973), British actress
James Cunniffe (1896–1926), American armed robber
John Cunniffe, defendant in Glik v. Cunniffe
Paul Cunniffe (1961–2001), British-born, Irish singer-songwriter
Tom Cunniffe, Gaelic footballer